The Gloria is a large luxury car made from 1959 by the Prince Motor Company, and later by Nissan Motors since its merger with the former - hence being originally marketed as Prince Gloria and later as Nissan Gloria. Initially based on the smaller Prince Skyline, the Gloria line was merged with Nissan Cedric starting with 1971 models and both continued until 2004, when they were both replaced by Nissan Fuga.

After Nissan assumed Prince's operations, the now Nissan-badged Glorias were sold along with the Nissan Skyline. They were marketed through the Nissan Prince Shop network, composed of dealerships that were formerly affiliated with the Prince company. The Prince G engine was used in the Gloria until 1969.

It was inspired by the Latin word "Glory".

First generation BLSI

The Prince Automobile Manufacturers, previously known as Fuji Precision Industry, released a modification of their Prince Skyline with a more luxurious approach, and modified exterior sheet metal, at the All Japan Automobile Show, after the Tokyo Motor Show and the Skyline 1900 exhibition, in October 1958. In February 1959 the BLSIP Gloria was released with the  1.9 L GB-30 OHV 4-cylinder engine. Reflecting popular appearances found in North America, the Gloria used a styling feature on the front bumper, called "Dagmar bumpers". The grille featured "PRINCE" in individual gold letters. The side trim was similar to the Skyline, except the chrome-framed painted strip ends at the rear door instead of the back of the car. The other side of the painted section is painted the same color as the car and inside this section is a "Prince Gloria" badge. Inside the Gloria used the same dashboard as the Skyline, but a clock and radio were standard. The radio featured two speakers, a new idea for the time. The seats were similar but were trimmed in a plush cloth fabric. The rear seat featured a fold down armrest.

In April 1959, Crown Prince Akihito was presented with the first Gloria as a wedding gift. According to the article found in Japanese Wikipedia, the Gloria got its name as a tribute when the first series BLSI sedan was presented to the then Crown Prince Akihito, the future Emperor of Japan, and Princess Michiko as an anniversary gift after one year of marriage. The Prince Automotive Industry was the official vehicle supplier to the Imperial Household Agency at that time, previously known as Fuji Precision Technology. Previously, the Crown Prince was also presented with the first Prince Sedan earlier.

In February 1960 the BLSIP-2 was released. The front end was modified with quad headlights and although the grille opening remained the same, the grille itself was changed, with six thick horizontal bars replacing the 13 thin horizontal bars. The rear end was completely redesigned; the tail lights were moved low to just above the rear bumper. The tail fins were capped off with stainless steel trim that ran from one fin, down under the trunk lid opening and back up the fin on the other side. The trunk lid featured a "Prince" badge and a "Gloria" badge to the right of it. The panel between the tail lights was covered in metal trim. Side trim remained identical from the BLSIP-1. The BLSIP-2 continued to use the GB-30 engine.

In February 1961 the BLSIP-3 was released. It featured the new  1.9 L GB-4 inline-four engine. The front end was changed slightly, with the "PRINCE" grille letters removed and instead a Prince badge on the left front side of the hood. The side trim and rear trim panels remained identical to the BLSIP-2.

The suspension used double wishbone and coil springs in the front, and De Dion setup in the back.

Second generation S40 

Later in 1962, Prince introduced the second generation, "S40" Gloria. It was the first six-cylinder Prince, while also offering an updated straight-four, the 94 hp (70 kW) 1.9 L G-2. In June 1963, the first mass-produced Japanese SOHC six-cylinder engine was introduced, known as the G-7, and was installed in the new Gloria Super 6, model S41. The same engine was used in the Gloria 6 Estate and in a commercial delivery van called "Gloria 6 Wagon". This new engine produces 106 hp SAE (79 kW) at 5,400 rpm, with a new SOHC head. The Gloria has an independent suspension in front and a de Dion tube in the back.

A prototype of the second generation Gloria had many design similarities to the Chevrolet Corvair, and Hino Contessa, but the production version was completely redesigned. The production Gloria shows some visual similarities to the 1959 Buick LeSabre, Invicta, and Electra, as evidenced in the strong character/beltline that encompasses the car, the wrap-around windshield and rear window, and the rear roof extension over the rear window. This Gloria also made it into export markets, for instance going on sale in Finland in April 1965.

On October 1962 at the 9th All-Japan Auto show, the 2.5 L G-11 engine was presented, although it was not immediately installed in any car. In May 1964, the Grand Gloria S44P was released. Its introduction preceded the 1964 Summer Olympics held later in October. This vehicle included electric power windows and the 2.5 L engine. This was the first Gloria that was no longer regarded as a compact sedan under Japanese vehicle classification regulations due to the engine displacement exceeding two litres.

The second Japan Grand Prix saw the G7B-R Gloria Super 6 engine win the T-VI class race, albeit installed in a lighter Skyline.

In 1966 the S41-2 series was introduced. The exterior remained the same from the S40-1 models, except the grille which had bigger rectangular slots. At the same time Prince merged with Nissan and because of this the badges were changed. In non-Asian markets the cars were sold as the Prince B200. Many cars featured a small "Nissan" badge on the back. The data tag in the engine compartment mentioned both Prince and Nissan. In some European markets the Gloria was sold as the PMC-Mikado Gloria 6. The Super Gloria was sold in export markets as the Prince B250. The S41-2 series continued to use the low compression version of the G-7 engine and the S44-2 continued to use the G-11 engine. The four cylinder engine was dropped.

The Gloria was the first Prince to be assembled outside Japan when New Zealand importer Croyden Motors contracted Steel Brothers Addington to assemble an initial 300 units from CKD kits at a new 1,000-unit factory specially built for the job.

Third generation A30 

April 1967 saw a restyle of the bodywork, and all Prince vehicles were now known as Nissan (but the A30 Gloria was officially registered as "Prince" to the Government). The former Prince company, now integrated into Nissan operations, was given the task of designing the Nissan Prince Royal, to be used by the Imperial Household, and thus presented a special version of the Gloria which had a similar appearance to the previous  Prince Royal. The styling of this generation (namely, the stacked headlights) appears to have been inspired by contemporary Cadillacs and Pontiacs, while the side mimiced the styling of Ford Galaxies from that era. The car also adopted some styling cues from the Nissan Prince Royal, built exclusively for the Emperor of Japan. Vehicles designated as the Super Deluxe, the Super 6 and Van Deluxe had the 6-cylinder engine, whereas the Standard and Van Standard used the 4-cylinder engine. Later the Super Deluxe GL became the top trim level. Due to the Gloria and Cedric being combined to save on production costs, the De Dion axle previously used by the Prince Gloria was downgraded to a solid rear axle with leaf springs.

The original model was the PA30 sedan and VPA30 wagon, originally fitted with Prince's own G7 six-cylinder engine. The four-cylinder version, with Nissan's H20 engine, was called A30 or VA30. In November 1969 Prince's six-cylinder motor was swapped for a Nissan unit; from now on the chassis code is HA30. Disc brakes for the front wheels were added to the options list.

With the introduction of the fourth generation in 1971, the Gloria model was merged with its former competitor, the Nissan Cedric, to become the Nissan Gloria. This name was also used in some export markets instead of the Cedric or 260C moniker. The Prince dealership network that sold the Gloria was renamed Nissan Prince Store, and the Gloria took the top level vehicle offered at Nissan Prince, while the Nissan Skyline became the junior model.

This generation of Prince was also assembled in New Zealand by Steel Brothers in Christchurch but was now badged as a Nissan Gloria though it was still imported by Croyden Motors, a separate company to Datsun importer Nissan-Datsun NZ Ltd. A total of 900 Prince and Nissan Glorias were built in NZ [Assembly, Mark Webster, 2002, p144] which corresponds to the annual low-volume import licence allocation of 300 CKD units a year under government policy of the time. Following the merger of Prince and Nissan in Japan, the Gloria in NZ effectively was replaced by Nissan-Datsun imports of Japanese-assembled Datsun 2300 Personal Six sedans and, later, imported 240C and locally assembled 260C sedans.

Fourth generation 230 

Starting with this generation in February 1971, the Cedric and Gloria were essentially the same vehicle, with the Gloria being more upscale than the Cedric. The hood ornament is a stylized version of the Japanese Paper Crane (Orizuru). The primary differences are the hood, radiator grille, taillights and wheel covers. This generation saw Nissan use the "coke bottle styling" appearance, shared with other 1970s Nissan products. The front of the vehicle shares some visual appearances with the 1967–1968 Mercury Marquis.

The four-cylinder is the H20-series OHV engine, with the 6-cylinder L20 engine using twin carburetors sourced from manufacturer SU carburetor. The H20P uses LPG for fuel, and the SD20 OHV is a diesel engine. The SD20 was the first time a diesel engine was offered in a Gloria.

October 1971 saw the 2.6-litre L26 six-cylinder engine added to the options list.

In August 1972, both a two-door hardtop coupé "personal luxury car" and a four-door hardtop was added, to compete with the Toyota Crown coupé.

Fifth generation 330 

This generation of the Gloria has been completely shared with the Cedric, essentially being the same vehicle, aside from changes in appearance. Halogen headlights are introduced to the Gloria, along with both a 2-door and 4-door hardtop body style, in addition to a 4-door sedan. The twin carburetors were removed from the small L20 six-cylinder, due to emission regulations. The 2.6 L engine is replaced with the larger 2.8 L version of the same. The overhead valve H20 four-cylinder engine remained in use for the 4-door sedan for taxi usage, usually running on LPG fuel.

October 1975 saw the introduction of the 2000GL-E and the 2000SGL-E, with the "E" designation signifying fuel injection, which was included in the Nissan NAPS emission control technology package..

June 1976 saw cosmetic changes, with halogen headlights being used on all versions except the sedan used for taxi service. Wheel covers are now painted to match the exterior body color.

June 1977 saw the introduction of the 2800 E Brougham at the top of the options list. The SD22 2.2 L diesel on the basic sedan and wagon, which was a first for the Gloria. Column shift is replaced with a floor-mounted system on the 4-door hardtop.

November 1978 saw another emissions adjustment. Items found on the 2800 Brougham were introduced on the 2000 SGL-E sedan and hardtop. Radial tires are introduced.

Sixth generation 430

June 1979 saw a completely redesigned Nissan Gloria with assistance with Pininfarina, with a more simple and straightforward appearance over the previous generation, and exchanging the single unit halogen headlights with 4 sealed beam headlight units. Computer-controlled fuel injection was added to more engines offered, with the "E" designation signifying fuel injection.

The 2-door hardtop coupe was discontinued and replaced with the luxury sports coupe Nissan Leopard.

Trim levels were expanded, and were designated the Brougham, SGL Extra, SGL, GL and the Jack Nicklaus edition which was very similar to the Brougham, which offered the turbo. Other trim levels were the Turbo S, Custom S, Custom Deluxe, Deluxe and the Standard at the bottom. The diesel engine SD22 was offered in 1979 on the sedan GL and DX. The Standard Sedan and Van were discontinued April 1981. October 1979, the 6-cylinder LD28 diesel was added with the automatic transmission selector moved from column shift to a floor-mounted system. December 1979 was when the first turbo L20ET was introduced,

February 1980 saw the LD28 6-cylinder offered with a 5-speed manual transmission installed with a floor-mounted shifter, but leaving the column shift for the 4-speed manual transmission. Later in April of that same year the Turbo Brougham appeared. A glass moonroof was also offered on SGL-F models.

In April 1981 both models get redesignation of the front grille, headlamp cluster, tail lamp, and "C Pillar" trim.

In order to avoid confusion between the 6th gen Gloria and Cedric (both these cars had identical body design and headlights for the 1979 model) Nissan gave both models different radiator grilles; vertical grilles for the Cedric and a horizontal grille for the Gloria

Seventh generation Y30 

June 4, 1983 saw a major restyle of the previous generation for all versions of the Gloria. Sedans used for taxi service utilized four round headlights whereas other versions upgraded to European style halogen headlights.

The straight-six engine, which had been used for many years, was upgraded to an all new V6-design, called the VG series engine which made its debut in the Cedric/Gloria. This was the first, mass production V6 engine built in Japan. The VG range uses fuel injection rather than carburetors for fuel delivery. The VG20ET was turbocharged, for better performance while staying within the Japanese tax parameters for a compact car. The twin-carbureted four-cylinder CA20S engine was fitted to the lowest-spec versions (standard, De Luxe). This four-cylinder was also available in a version built to run on LPG fuel, meant to be used for taxi service. From February 1984 there was also a six-cylinder L20P, which also ran on LPG. In June 1984 the powerful 3-litre VG30ET turbo V6 was introduced.

Trim levels offered were the Brougham, SGL, Grand Edition, GL Grand Edition, GL and the Standard. In June 1984 the Brougham VIP appeared as the top level car. The Jack Nicklaus special edition, introduced with the previous edition, was a sales success for the company and continued to be offered as a hardtop and only with a turbocharged engine. Electronic adaptive self-levelling air suspension also appeared in June 1984.

For the four-door hardtop, the front driver and passenger seat belt shoulder strap was connected at the top to the ceiling, however, the upper portion could be detached, with the shoulder strap resting on the driver's and passenger's shoulder so that rear passengers could have an unobstructed view from the rear seat without the seat belt hanging from the ceiling. The upper part would then swing up to the ceiling and could be fastened into place.

June 1985 saw mild exterior changes, with the biggest mechanical change being a variable nozzle for the VG20ET turbocharged engine. The diesel straight-six engine LD28 was also upgraded to the RD28 Straight-6 engine. An ultrasonic sensing electronically controlled suspension called Super Sonic suspension was added to the options list, with an upgrade to MacPherson struts for the front and a rigid link coil suspension for the rear.

Export versions usually received the diesel sixes or the three-liter six-cylinder engines, although there was also a version with the four-cylinder 2.3-litre SD23 engine, producing  (SAE net).

Eighth generation Y31

The Y31 sedan was introduced in 1987. The Y30 hardtop was replaced by the succeeding Y32, and the Y30 Wagon/Van version was not replaced. After this generation, Glorias were only available to private customers in four-door hardtop guise. Engines available continue to be the newly developed VG series engine, with the VG20DET adding DOHC, another first for Nissan. June 1987 saw a special-edition Gloria intended for parade usage.

The four-speed automatic transmission is now computer controlled for smoother shifts. The transmission now exclusively uses a floor-mounted gear shifter, and a five-speed manual transmission was still available. The rear suspension was upgraded to multi-link independent setup. Trim levels are standard, Custom, Super Custom, Classic, Classic SV, Gran Turismo, and Brougham VIP. There was also a long wheelbase model built by Autech. The Gran Turismo received more sport-oriented styling, adding a youthful appearance, which found new, younger, buyers. The sedan version of the Y31 was rebodied at the launch of the Y32. The Gloria is mechanically related to the Crew, although the former is larger.

The Gloria competed for buyers with related Nissan vehicles that shared platforms used for the Gloria, specifically, the Nissan Cima, Nissan Leopard and the Nissan Cedric, as well as other sport-oriented vehicles, such as the Nissan Cefiro, Nissan Skyline and Nissan Laurel.

The Gloria Y31 can be distinguished from its sibling, the Cedric Y31 by the taillights at the back. Unlike its sibling, the Gloria has not received a new body.

June 1987 saw a special-edition Gloria built for parade usage. The sedan remains with unchanged body appearance and is still in production currently. Private Glorias are now only available in 4-door hardtop guise. Engines available continue to be the newly developed VG series engine, with the VG20DET adding DOHC, another first for Nissan.

The 4-speed automatic transmission is now computer controlled for smoother shifts. The transmission now exclusively uses a floor mounted gear shifter, and a 5-speed manual transmission is still available. The rear suspension was upgraded to multi-link independent setup. Trim levels start with the VIP Brougham, Gran Tourismo, Classic SV, Classic and Super Custom. The Gran Turismo received more sport-oriented styling, adding a youthful appearance, which found new, younger, buyers.

Ninth generation Y32

This generation was introduced June 1991, and was offered as a sedan; a center "B" pillar was added to improve vehicle solidity, and improve crash worthiness, but is obscured behind side window glass and frameless side windows. The VG series engine continues to be offered with the 5-speed computer-controlled automatic transmission, with the 4-speed offered with the RD28 diesel engine. A manual transmission was no longer offered.

Trim levels offered were the Gran Turismo SV, Grand Turismo, and the top level vehicle is called the Gran Turismo ULTIMA. Other trim levels offered were the Brougham VIP type C, Brougham G, Brougham, Classic SV and the Classic.

By then, the popularity of the Nissan Cima affected sales of the Gloria, as sales were not as high as in past generations.

Tenth generation Y33

The Y33 series Nissan Gloria is given a body restyle and introduced June 1995. Major changes were the introduction of the newly developed VQ series engine, and replacing the VG series, with the VQ30DET turbo utilizing an intercooler and DOHC valvetrain architecture. AWD is introduced only on the RB25DET, including Nissan's ATTESA E-TS. The diesel RD28 is now only available with a 4-speed automatic transmission. Due to economic pressure, some of the trim levels are discontinued, leaving the Gran Turismo type X, Gran Turismo Ultima, Gran Turismo SV, Gran Turismo S, Gran Turismo, Brougham VIP, Brougham and the Brougham J.

The four-door sedan is no longer offered, leaving the four-door hardtop as the only bodystyle.

Eleventh generation Y34

June 1999 saw the release of the final version of the Gloria, with design assistance from Porsche. Direct Injection is introduced on all engines with the "DD" designation. The AWD was offered only on vehicles with the RB25DET engine. The top levels 300 ULTIMA-Z and the 300 ULTIMA-ZV were available with the CVT transmission as the only option.

January 7, 2000 saw Autech release a 40th anniversary edition of the Gloria.

End of production
Production of the Gloria ended after 46 years, and was replaced by the Nissan Fuga in October 2004.

References

External links

Nissan Sedan history (japanese site)
RatDat.com - paint colors, sales brochures, and model names

Full-size vehicles
Gloria
Luxury vehicles
Executive cars
Cars introduced in 1959
1960s cars
1970s cars
1980s cars
1990s cars
2000s cars